Paolo Farinella (13 January 1953 – 25 March 2000) was an Italian scientist very active in the field of planetary science and in particular in the study of asteroids and small bodies of the Solar System.

Biography 
Paolo Farinella was born on 13 January 1953 in Migliarino, close to Ferrara in Italy. He received his degree in 1975 at the University and the "Scuola Normale Superiore" of Pisa. After that he became a graduate student of Giuseppe (Bepi) Colombo and worked as a research astronomer at the Observatory of Brera.

From 1982 to 1998, he was a university researcher in Pisa, at the Department of Mathematics and at the Scuola Normale Superiore, teaching Physics and Celestial Mechanics. In the period 1992–1994 he was visiting professor at the Nice Observatory with an ESA "Giuseppe Colombo" fellowship.

In summer 1998 he won a national competition for a position of associate professor of astronomy and astrophysics in the Italian university, and starting from late 1998 he taught at the University of Trieste.
Paolo Farinella died in Bergamo on 25 March 2000, due to heart failure.

The work as planetary scientist 

His work as planetary scientist changed the view of the solar system revolutionizing the way orbital and collisional histories of asteroids are seen.
He used his ideas in many fields of the space science that can be summarized in the following activities:
 Planetary science: small bodies, collisions, satellites, dynamics and space debris;
 Space geodesy and fundamental physics;
 Science popularization, social commitment of concerned scientists.

In 1980's Farinella was among the first scientists to conjecture the Yarkovsky effect to be responsible for the migration of small asteroids from the main asteroid belt into different and potentially resonant orbits, with possible risks of impact on Earth.

Paolo Farinella was a member of the Editorial Board of "Icarus" and an Associate Editor of "Icarus" and "Meteoritics and Planetary Science". He was a member of the International Astronomical Union (IAU) and an affiliate member of the Division of Planetary Science (DPS) of the American Astronomical Society as well as a member of the Solar System Working Group of the European Space Agency.

He was very active into the astronomy popularization, writing dozens of articles that were mainly published by the Italian astronomical magazine “L'Astronomia”.

In June 2010, ten years after his death, an international workshop in his name was held in Pisa.  The Paolo Farinella Prize was proposed at this workshop and is now given in his honor.

In July 2015, after the New Horizons fly-by with Pluto, the New Horizons team gave the provisional name "Farinella" to a crater on Pluto, north of the Tombaugh Regio.

Asteroid 3248 Farinella is named after him.

References 

 Farinella, Paolo; Gonczi, R.; Froeschlé, Christiane; Froeschlé, Claude; "The injection of Asteroid Fragments into Resonances", Icarus n. 101, 174-187 (1993)
 Vokrouhlicky, D.; Farinella, Paolo; Mignard, F.; "Solar radiation pressure perturbations for earth satellites", Astronomy and Astrophysics 285, 333-343 (1994)
 Farinella, Paolo; Froeschlé, Christiane; Froeschlé, Claude; Gonczi, R.; Hahn, G.; Morbidelli, Alessandro; Valsecchi, G.; "Asteroids falling into the Sun", Nature Vol. 371, 22 September 1994
 Farinella, Paolo; Vokrouhlicky, D.; Barlier, F.; "The rotation of LAGEOS and its long-term semimajor axis decay: A self-consistent solution", Journal of Geophysical Research Vol 101, NO. B8, pages 17,861-17,872, August 10, 1996

External links 
 Paolo Farinella: his life and his scientific bequest by Andrea Milani
 Paolo Farinella International Workshop: the scientist and the man
 Paolo Farinella, planetary scientist
 Paolo Farinella memorial, written by Donald R. Davis on Meteoritics & Planetary Science
 Informal Names for Features on Pluto

20th-century Italian astronomers
1953 births
2000 deaths